Baggio may refer to:

Given name
 Baggio Hušidić (born 1987), Bosnian-American association football midfielder
 Baggio Leung (born 1986), Hong Kong activist and politician
 Baggio Rakotoarisoa (born 1996), Malagasy football player
 Baggio Rakotonomenjanahary (born 1991), Malagasy football player
 Baggio Wallenburg (born 1999), Dutch football player

Surname
 Dino Baggio, Italian footballer
 Eddy Baggio, footballer
 Fabio Baggio (1965), Italian priest of the Scalabrinian Missionaries
 Roberto Baggio, Italian footballer
 Sebastiano Baggio, Italian cardinal of the Catholic Church
 Anselmo da Baggio, Pope Alexander II

Other
 Baggio (district of Milan)
 Baggio Cemetery
 Baggio Il Gallo, a single-seat Italian aircraft
 Baggio–Yoshinari syndrome, an infectious disease
 Baggio: The Divine Ponytail, a 2021 biographical film about Roberto Baggio
 Lycée César Baggio in Lille, France

Italian-language surnames